Mikhail Viktorovich Popkov (born 7 March 1964) is a Russian serial killer, rapist, and necrophile who committed the sexual assault and murder of seventy-eight girls and women between 1992 and 2010 in Angarsk, Irkutsk, in Siberia, and Vladivostok in Far East, although he has confessed to and is suspected of at least eighty-three in total. He is known as "The Werewolf" and the "Angarsk Maniac" for the particularly brutal nature of his crimes; he would extensively mutilate the bodies of his victims and perform sexual acts on them.

Popkov, a former police officer and security guard, was convicted of 22 murders in 2015 and sentenced to life imprisonment, and confessed to an additional 59 three years later; on December 10, 2018, he was convicted for 56 of the 59 additional killings, three of which the police could not find sufficient evidence with which to be proven, and given a second life sentence. There were calls for Popkov to be executed, but this was unavailable as capital punishment in Russia is subject to a formal moratorium.

Life
Mikhail Popkov was born in Norilsk, Krasnoyarsk Krai, in what was then the Russian Soviet Federative Socialist Republic on 7 March 1964 and soon moved with his parents to Angarsk, Irkutsk Oblast. Little is known about his upbringing and personal life beyond that he was married to Elena Popkova and had a daughter named Ekaterina. Popkov worked as a police officer in the Irkutsk region, and by the time of his capture had also spent time as a security guard at the Angarsk Oil and Chemical Company as well as at a private firm.

Crimes
From 1992 to 2010, Popkov killed dozens of women between the ages of 16 and 40, as well as one policeman, in his home city of Angarsk and other locations within the Irkutsk region. He has stated that he “wanted to cleanse the streets of prostitutes,” and that “committing the murders, I was guided by my inner convictions.” He also falsely accused his wife of infidelity, and claimed that his brutality was the result of this imagined betrayal. Angarsk psychiatrist Alexander Grishin speculates that growing up with an alcoholic, allegedly abusive mother likely contributed.

Popkov targeted women who did things he considered immoral, such as going to parties without male chaperones. His usual tactic for luring victims was to go out at night wearing his police uniform, find a potential victim, and offer them a lift in his police car. Instead, he drove to remote locations where he forced them to disrobe, killed them with tools including knives, axes, baseball bats, and screwdrivers, and raped their bodies. He also mutilated them so severely that Russian media nicknamed him "The Werewolf" and the "Angarsk maniac".

Investigation, arrest, trial, and sentencing
Russian police were involved in the search for one perpetrator as slain women were discovered in the mid-1990s, killed by similar methods. Despite extensive inquiries and testimonies from surviving victims, Popkov eluded police for two decades. However, investigators discovered a pattern: tracks from a Lada 4×4, an off-road vehicle used by law enforcement, were found at numerous crime scenes. DNA testings of 3,500 current and former policemen in Irkutsk in 2012 facilitated Popkov's capture that same year. In January 2015, he was sentenced to life in prison for 22 murders and two attempted murders.

Subsequent confessions
Two years later, Popkov confessed to 59 additional killings, a total victim count which surpasses those of Russian serial killers Andrei Chikatilo and Alexander Pichushkin. On December 10, 2018, after a trial in the regional court of Irkutsk in Siberia, he was convicted of 56 further murders; the three other alleged killings could not be confirmed due to lack of evidence. He was given a second life sentence.

In July 2020, Popkov confessed to two more killings, bringing the total number of admitted victims to 83.

See also 
 List of Russian serial killers
 List of serial killers by country

References 

1964 births
20th-century Russian criminals
21st-century Russian criminals
Axe murder
Inmates of Black Dolphin Prison
Living people
Male serial killers
Necrophiles
People convicted of murder by Russia
People from Angarsk
Prisoners sentenced to life imprisonment by Russia
Russian male criminals
Russian murderers of children
Russian police officers convicted of murder
Russian prisoners sentenced to life imprisonment
Russian rapists
Russian serial killers
Security guards convicted of crimes
Serial killers who worked in law enforcement
Violence against women in Russia
People from Norilsk